Play the Funk is a compilation album released in 2000 by Wild Cherry.

Track listing
 "Play That Funky Music"
 "Baby Don't You Know"
 "99½"
 "Don't Go Near the Water"
 "Electrified Funk"
 "Hot to Trot"
 "It's All Up to You"
 "It's the Same Old Song"
 "I Love My Music"
 "Try a Piece of My Love"

Wild Cherry (band) albums
2000 compilation albums